Tobacco and Salt Museum (Japanese:たばこと塩の博物館) is located in Sumida-ku, Tokyo. It was established in 1978 and run by Japan Tobacco. The museum was originally located in Shibuya, but in 2015 it was relocated to Sumida. The museum has about 38,000 artifacts that shows the history of tobacco and salt both from Japan and overseas. It holds a 1.4 tonne rock salt from Poland along with other blocks of rock salts that are brought from various parts of world. There is also a replica of a Mayan shrine from South America to show the place from where tobacco was first used.

The museum also has a workshop room, a reading room and a museum shop.

References

Museums in Tokyo
Tobacco
Salts
Buildings and structures in Sumida, Tokyo
Museums established in 1978
1978 establishments in Japan
Japan Tobacco